John Joseph Patrick Ryan (December 30, 1920 – January 21, 1998), best known by his stage name, Jack Lord, was an American television, film and Broadway actor, director and producer. He starred as Steve McGarrett in the CBS television program Hawaii Five-O, which ran from 1968 to 1980.

Early years 
Born in the Bushwick section of Brooklyn, New York, Lord was the son of Irish-American parents. His father, William Lawrence Ryan, was a steamship company executive. He grew up in Richmond Hill, Queens, New York.

As a child, Lord developed his equestrian skills on his mother's fruit farm in the Hudson River Valley. He started spending summers at sea, and from the decks of cargo ships painted and sketched the landscapes he encountered—Africa, the Mediterranean and China. He was educated at St. Benedict Joseph Labre School, John Adams High School, in Ozone Park, Queens, and the United States Merchant Marine Academy, then located at Fort Trumbull in New London, Connecticut, graduating as an Ensign with a Third Mates License. He attended New York University (NYU) on a football scholarship, and earned a degree in Fine Arts.

Lord spent the first year of the United States' involvement in World War II with the United States Army Corps of Engineers, building bridges in Persia. He returned to the Merchant Marine as an able seaman before enrolling in the deck officer course at Fort Trumbull. While making maritime training films, Lord took to the idea of acting.

Career 
Lord received theatrical training from Sanford Meisner at the Neighborhood Playhouse. He worked first as a car salesman for Horgan Ford, then later as a Cadillac salesman in New York to fund his studies. Later he studied at the Actors Studio.

His Broadway debut was as Slim Murphy in Horton Foote's The Traveling Lady with Kim Stanley. The show ran for 30 performances, October 27, 1954, through November 20, 1954. Lord won the Theatre World Award for his performance. Lord was then cast as Brick in a replacement for Ben Gazzara in the 1955–1956 production of Cat on a Hot Tin Roof. He had been in  The Little Hut (his first play), The Illegitimist, and The Savage.

His first commercial film role was in the 1949 film The Red Menace a.k.a. Project X, an anti-Communist production. He was associate producer in his 1950 film Cry Murder. In 1957, Lord starred in Williamsburg: the Story of a Patriot, which has run daily at Colonial Williamsburg since then. In 1958, Lord co-starred as Buck Walden in God's Little Acre, the film adaptation of Erskine Caldwell's 1933 novel.

Lord was the first actor to play the character Felix Leiter in the James Bond film series, introduced in 1962 in the first Bond film, Dr. No. According to screenwriter Richard Maibaum, Lord then demanded co-star billing, a bigger role and more money to reprise the role in Goldfinger, which resulted in director Guy Hamilton casting Cec Linder in the role; thereafter, until David Hedison played the role for a second time in 1989's Licence to Kill, the character would be played by a different actor for each appearance.

In 1962, Lord starred as series namesake Stoney Burke, a rodeo cowboy from Mission Ridge, South Dakota. The basis for the series was real-life champion rodeo rider Casey Tibbs. The series featured Warren Oates and Bruce Dern in recurring supporting roles. Lord credited Gary Cooper as his on-screen role model, and the inspiration for his characterization of Stoney Burke.

Lord was considered for Eliot Ness in The Untouchables before Robert Stack won the role. He did appear in the Season One episode "The Jake Lingle Killing." In 1965, he guest-starred as Colonel 'Pres' Gallagher in second-season episode 5, "Big Brother" of 12 O'Clock High. Other television guest appearances include Appointment with Adventure, The Americans, Bonanza, Gunsmoke, The High Chaparral, Combat!, The Man from U.N.C.L.E., The Reporter starring Harry Guardino, The Fugitive, The Invaders, Rawhide, Ironside, and The F.B.I.

Lord appeared on the first episode of Have Gun, Will Travel. In 1968, he appeared with Susan Strasberg in the film The Name of the Game Is Kill!.

According to William Shatner, in 1966, Gene Roddenberry offered Lord the role of Captain James T. Kirk on Star Trek, to replace Jeffrey Hunter, whose wife was making too many demands. Lord asked for 50 percent ownership of the show, so Roddenberry offered the role to Shatner.

Hawaii Five-O 

Lord starred in Hawaii Five-O for its 12 seasons (1968 to 1980) as Detective Steve McGarrett, appointed by the governor to head the (fictional) State Police criminal investigation department in Honolulu, Hawaii. The opening sequence includes a shot of Lord standing on a penthouse balcony of the Ilikai hotel. Chin Ho Kelly, the name of the police detective played by Kam Fong, was a tip-of-the-hat to Ilikai developer Chinn Ho. Lord's catchphrase, "Book 'em, Danno!", became a part of pop culture. In the original run of the series (but not in syndication), at the end of each episode would be a promo: "This is Jack Lord inviting you to be with us next week for (name of episode). Be here. Aloha!" He was instrumental in the casting of native Hawaiians, instead of mainland actors. Lord insisted his character drive Ford vehicles; McGarrett drove a 1967 Mercury Park Lane in the pilot, a 1968 Park Lane from 1968 to 1974, and a 1974 Mercury Marquis for the remainder of the series (this very car was shown in the 2010 remake).

When series creator Leonard Freeman died in 1974, the show's ownership was shared among Lord, CBS and Freeman's estate, with a contract that made Lord executive producer and gave him complete control over content. He was a hands-on partner who paid attention to minute details, and was known for battles with network executives.

Cinematographers sometimes refer to a 50mm lens ("5-0") as a "Jack Lord" in reference to the name of the show that made him famous.

Artist 
During his years at NYU, Lord and his brother Bill opened the Village Academy of Arts. Jack's childhood dream was to become an artist. His first professional sale was in 1941 to the Metropolitan Museum of Art for his two linoleum cuts, entitled Vermont and Fishing Shacks, Block Island.

Personal life
In 1942, Lord married his first wife, Ann Willard. They divorced in 1947. Their union produced a son, but Lord only saw him once when the boy was an infant. On August 24, 1955, his son died, aged 12 years, following a brief battle with hepatitis (he was buried in Fairfield County, Connecticut [state file number 14006]). Lord only learned of his son's death after receiving a copy of his death certificate from his son's mother. Ann Willard Ryan remarried in the 1950s and died on December 30, 2004. 

Lord met his second wife while house hunting in upstate New York. On January 17, 1949, Lord married fashion designer Marie de Narde (1905-2005), a job she gave up to devote her time to him and his career. Until 1957, the couple lived near the Lescaze House on East 48th Street in  New York before moving to California.

Death
After Hawaii Five-O ended in 1980, Lord kept a low profile and was rarely seen in public. His final TV appearance was that same year in a failed pilot for a new CBS series called M Station: Hawaii which he also directed (it had been filmed in early 1979, immediately before shooting the final season of Hawaii Five-O). Lord suffered from Alzheimer's disease for at least seven years before his death, though some accounts have suggested that he may have had the illness as early as the final season of Hawaii Five-O, in 1979. He died of congestive heart failure at his home in Honolulu, on January 21, 1998, at the age of 77, leaving an estate of $40 million. He was a philanthropist and the entire estate went to Hawaiian charities upon his wife Marie's death at the age of 100 in 2005.

Memorial 
A bronze bust of Lord by Hawaii sculptor Lynn Weiler Liverton was unveiled in a ceremony at the Kahala Mall outside Macy's on June 19, 2004. The Lords lived in a condominium in the Kahala area, and they were known to frequent the neighborhood mall. The nonprofit Jack Lord Memorial Fund, which raised the money for the memorial, was co-chaired by British Hawaii Five-O fan Esperanza Isaac and Lord's co-star Doug Mossman.

Filmography

References

External links

Jack Lord at the University of Wisconsin's Actors Studio audio collection
Jack Lord early in career; NYP Library
Jack Lord Website—A comprehensive Website on Jack Lord
 

1920 births
1998 deaths
20th-century American male actors
American male film actors
American male television actors
American people of Irish descent
American sailors
John Adams High School (Queens) alumni
Male actors from New York City
Military personnel from New York City
New York University alumni
People from Richmond Hill, Queens
United States Army personnel of World War II
United States Army soldiers
United States Merchant Marine Academy alumni
United States Merchant Mariners
United States Merchant Mariners of World War II
Western (genre) television actors